The 2010 European Trophy was a European ice hockey tournament, played between 11 August and 5 September 2010. It was the first edition of the European Trophy. The final weekend was played in Salzburg and Zell am See, with the final held at the Eisarena Salzburg, which Eisbären Berlin won 5–3 over HV71 Jönköping.

Participating clubs 
The 2010 edition featured 18 participating clubs from seven countries around Europe. The clubs were divided into two divisions: the Capital Division and the Central Division. Each division consisted of nine teams in a regulation round, while the top four teams of each division qualified for the playoffs. However, the Red Bull Salzburg qualified as hosts and therefore took over the worst fourth ranked team out of both divisions, as they failed to end up in the top 4 spots in the Central Division.

Regulation round

Capital Division

Standings

Games

August 11
 HIFK – Eisbären Berlin 3 – 3 (0–1, 2–0, 1–1) 
 Jokerit – Adler Mannheim 2 – 1 (0–0, 1–1, 1–0) 
 Vålerenga IF – Sparta Praha 1 – 4 (1–2, 0–1, 0–1) 
 Linköpings HC – Färjestads BK 1 – 2 (0–2, 0–0, 1–0) 

August 13
 Jokerit – Eisbären Berlin 7 – 2 (1–0, 3–1, 3–1) 
 HIFK – Sparta Praha 5 – 3 (4–1, 1–0, 0–2) 
 Vålerenga IF – Adler Mannheim 3 – 2 GWS (1–2, 1–0, 0–0, 0–0, 1–0) 
 Djurgårdens IF – Linköpings HC 5 – 0 (3–0, 1–0, 1–0) 

August 14
 Vålerenga IF – Eisbären Berlin 1 – 5 (0–1, 1–3, 0–1) 
 Färjestads BK – Djurgårdens IF 2 – 1 (2–0, 0–1, 0–0) 
 HIFK – Adler Mannheim 1 – 2 (0–2, 1–0, 0–0) 
 Jokerit – Sparta Praha 0 – 2 (0–1, 0–1, 0–0) 

August 18
 Sparta Praha – Färjestads BK 5 – 1 (0–0, 2–0, 3–1) 
 Jokerit – HIFK 3 – 1 (2–0, 0–0, 1–1) 
 Adler Mannheim – Djurgårdens IF 3 – 0 (0–0, 2–0, 1–0) 
 Eisbären Berlin – Linköpings HC 4 – 3 GWS (1–1, 2–2, 0–0, 0–0, 1–0) 

August 20
 Sparta Praha – Djurgårdens IF 0 – 1 GWS (0–0, 0–0, 0–0, 0–0, 0–1) 
 Jokerit – Vålerenga IF 2 – 1 (1–1, 0–0, 1–0) 
 Eisbären Berlin – Färjestads BK 5 – 2 (1–0, 2–0, 2–2) 
 Adler Mannheim – Linköpings HC 4 – 5 GWS (3–3, 1–0, 0–1, 0–0, 0–1) 

August 21
 Eisbären Berlin – Djurgårdens IF 4 – 2 (1–1, 0–1, 3–0) 
 Adler Mannheim – Färjestads BK 6 – 4 (2–0, 3–1, 1–1) 
 HIFK – Vålerenga IF  7 – 3 (3–2, 2–0, 2–1) 
 Sparta Praha – Linköpings HC 0 – 2 (0–0, 0–1, 0–1)

August 25
 Sparta Praha – Adler Mannheim 6 – 1 (3–0, 2–0, 1–1) 
 Vålerenga IF – Färjestads BK 2 – 7 (0–2, 1–4, 1–1) 
 Djurgårdens IF – HIFK 5 – 3 (1–0, 2–2, 2–1) 
 Linköpings HC – Jokerit 3 – 1 (1–1, 1–0, 1–0) 

August 27
 Linköpings HC – HIFK 0 – 3 (0–1, 0–2, 0–0) 
 Djurgårdens IF – Vålerenga IF 6 – 2 (2–0, 2–2, 2–0) 
 Färjestads BK – Jokerit 2 – 1 (1–0, 0–0, 0–1) 
 Eisbären Berlin – Sparta Praha 5 – 2 (1–0, 3–1, 1–1) 

August 28
 Vålerenga IF – Linköpings HC 7 – 5 (3–0, 2–2, 2–3) 
 Djurgårdens IF – Jokerit 3 – 4 SD (1–1, 1–2, 1–0, 0–1) 
 Adler Mannheim – Eisbären Berlin 1 – 3 (0–0, 1–1, 0–2) 
 Färjestads BK – HIFK 6 – 4 (2–1, 3–2, 1–1)

Central Division

Standings

Games

August 11
 Oulun Kärpät – EC Red Bull Salzburg 3 – 2 (1–0, 2–1, 0–1) 
 TPS – ZSC Lions 5 – 4 (2–1, 3–2, 0–1) 
 Tappara – SC Bern 1 – 4 (0–1, 0–2, 1–1) 
 Malmö Redhawks – Frölunda Indians 1 – 2 (0–0, 0–2, 1–0) 

August 12
 Frölunda Indians – HV71 Jönköping 1 – 8 (0–5, 1–2, 0–1) 

August 13
 TPS – SC Bern 4 – 3 (3–0, 0–0, 1–3) 
 Oulun Kärpät – ZSC Lions 4 – 0 (2–0, 1–0, 1–0) 
 Tappara – EC Red Bull Salzburg 3 – 4 SD (0–0, 3–1, 0–2, 0–1) 
 HV71 Jönköping – Malmö Redhawks 5 – 2 (1–1, 3–1, 1–0) 

August 14
 Oulun Kärpät – SC Bern 3 – 2 (1–1, 0–0, 2–1) 
 Tappara – ZSC Lions 3 – 6 (0–2, 1–3, 2–1) 
 TPS – EC Red Bull Salzburg 0 – 3 (0–1, 0–1, 0–1) 

August 18
 TPS – Oulun Kärpät 4 – 3 SD (2–0, 0–1, 1–2, 1–0) 
 EC Red Bull Salzburg – Frölunda Indians 4 – 5 SD (1–2, 1–2, 2–0, 0–1) 
 ZSC Lions – HV71 Jönköping 1 – 6 (1–5, 0–1, 0–0) 
 SC Bern – Malmö Redhawks 5 – 1 (1–1, 3–0, 1–0) 

August 19
 SC Bern – HV71 Jönköping 5 – 1 (1–0, 2–0, 2–1) 

August 20
 Oulun Kärpät – Tappara 3 – 2 (2–1, 0–1, 1–0) 
 EC Red Bull Salzburg – Malmö Redhawks 2 – 3 SD (1–0, 1–1, 0–1, 0–1) 
 ZSC Lions – Frölunda Indians 4 – 3 SD (0–0, 2–2, 1–1, 1–0) 

August 21
 ZSC Lions – Malmö Redhawks 4 – 1 (1–0, 1–1, 2–0) 
 Tappara – TPS 0 – 3 (0–2, 0–1, 0–0) 
 EC Red Bull Salzburg – HV71 Jönköping 3 – 4 (1–1, 0–2, 2–1) 
 SC Bern – Frölunda Indians 3 – 2 (1–1, 1–0, 1–1) 

August 25
 HV71 Jönköping – Oulun Kärpät 6 – 0 (3–0, 3–0, 0–0) 
 Frölunda Indians – Tappara 4 – 1 (1–0, 3–0, 1–1) 
 Malmö Redhawks – TPS 0 – 3 (0–1, 0–1, 0–1) 
 EC Red Bull Salzburg – ZSC Lions 4 – 2 (0–0, 2–1, 2–1) 

August 27
 Malmö Redhawks – Oulun Kärpät 2 – 5 (1–2, 1–0, 0–3) 
 HV71 Jönköping – Tappara 4 – 3 SD (2–2, 1–1, 0–0, 1–0) 
 Frölunda Indians – TPS 7 – 6 SD (3–3, 2–2, 1–1, 1–0) 
 ZSC Lions – SC Bern 2 – 3 (0–0, 2–0, 0–3) 

August 28
 Frölunda Indians – Oulun Kärpät 7 – 4 (1–0, 2–2, 4–2) 
 HV71 Jönköping – TPS 5 – 0 (1–0, 3–0, 1–0) 
 Malmö Redhawks – Tappara 2 – 3 (0–0, 1–2, 1–1) 
 SC Bern – EC Red Bull Salzburg 2 – 3 SD (1–0, 1–0, 0–2, 0–1)

Statistics

Scoring leaders

Leading goaltenders

Playoffs 
The top four teams of each division qualified for the playoffs, which took place in Salzburg and Zell am See between 3–5 September. However, EC Red Bull Salzburg qualified as hosts, as they failed to finish among the four best teams in their division, and therefore the best fourth ranked team out of both divisions qualified for the playoffs.

Bracket

Matches 
All times are local (UTC+2).

Quarter-finals

5th place qualification games

Semi-finals

7th place game

5th place game

Bronze medal game

Final

Statistics

Scoring leaders

Leading goaltenders

Final standings

References

 2010 European Trophy game schedule
 European Trophy team stats
 2010 European Trophy regular season stats at Eliteprospects.com
 2010 European Trophy playoff stats at Eliteprospects.com

External links
 
 Playoff schedule at RedBullsSalute.com

See also 
 2010 European Trophy Junior

  
1
European Trophy